Queanbeyan–Palerang Regional Council is a local government area located in the Southern Tablelands region of New South Wales, Australia. The council was formed on 12 May 2016 through a merger of the City of Queanbeyan and Palerang Council.

At the m it had a population of 63,304.

Towns and localities 
The Queanbeyan urban area contains the following localities

The balance of the Queanbeyan–Palerang Regional Council area contains the towns of:

It also contains the following localities:

Demographics 
The population for the predecessor councils was estimated in 2015 as:
 in City of Queanbeyan and
 in Palerang Council

Council
Queanbeyan–Palerang Regional Council comprises eleven Councillors elected proportionally in a single ward. Labor Councillor Kendrick Winchester was elected mayor in January 2022.

The current composition of council is:

See also

 Local government areas of New South Wales

References

 
Local government areas of New South Wales
2016 establishments in Australia